Flanders is an English surname. Notable people with the surname include:

 Angela Flanders (1927–2016), British perfumer
 Benjamin Flanders (1816–1896), American politician 
 Dennis Flanders (1915–1994), British artist
 Ed Flanders (1934–1995), American actor
 Harley Flanders (1925–2013), American mathematician
 James E. Flanders (c.1849–1928), American architect
 Judith Flanders (born 1959), British historian and author
 Laura Flanders (born 1961), English journalist
 Michael Flanders (1922–1975), English actor, broadcaster, and writer
 Ralph Edward Flanders (1880–1970), American engineer and politician 
 Stephanie Flanders (born 1968), English journalist
 Walter Flanders (1871–1923), American industrialist

Fictional characters:
Moll Flanders 
Ned Flanders, a character on The Simpsons

Other uses:
 John Flanders, pseudonym of the Belgian writer Jean Ray (author) (1887–1964)
 John Buchanan (cricketer, born 1953) (born 1953), former coach of the Australia cricket team, has the nickname Ned Flanders, due to a supposed resemblance to the character on The Simpsons

English-language surnames